A list of the 41 municipalities (comuni) of the Metropolitan City of Bari, Apulia, Italy.

List

References

 01
Bari